Tous is a municipality in the Valencian Community, in the province of Valencia. The town is notable for the dam failure which occurred in 1982, when an unusually severe rainfall swelled the river Jucar, breaking the Tous Dam.  The dam operator was unable to open the spillway gate, and the water overtopped the dam, which then failed, provoking a flood of 16,000 m3/s and more than 30 casualties. The flood was called La Pantanada.

References

Municipalities in the Province of Valencia
Ribera Alta (comarca)